Agalenocosa is a genus of spiders in the family Lycosidae. It was first described in 1944 by Mello-Leitão. , it contains 18 species with a wide distribution.

Species

Agalenocosa comprises the following species:
Agalenocosa bryantae (Roewer, 1951)
Agalenocosa chacoensis (Mello-Leitão, 1942)
Agalenocosa denisi (Caporiacco, 1947)
Agalenocosa fallax (L. Koch, 1877)
Agalenocosa gamas Piacentini, 2014
Agalenocosa gentilis Mello-Leitão, 1944
Agalenocosa grismadoi Piacentini, 2014
Agalenocosa helvola (C. L. Koch, 1847)
Agalenocosa kolbei (Dahl, 1908)
Agalenocosa luteonigra (Mello-Leitão, 1945)
Agalenocosa melanotaenia (Mello-Leitão, 1941)
Agalenocosa pickeli (Mello-Leitão, 1937)
Agalenocosa pirity Piacentini, 2014
Agalenocosa punctata Mello-Leitão, 1944
Agalenocosa subinermis (Simon, 1897)
Agalenocosa tricuspidata (Tullgren, 1905)
Agalenocosa velox (Keyserling, 1891)
Agalenocosa yaucensis (Petrunkevitch, 1929)

References

Lycosidae
Araneomorphae genera
Cosmopolitan spiders